Randy Nteka (born 6 December 1997) is a French professional footballer who plays for La Liga club Elche CF, on loan from Rayo Vallecano. Mainly an attacking midfielder, he can also play as a forward.

Club career

Early career
Born in Paris, Nteka left his hometown and joined Spanish side Betis San Isidro on a trial period in 2016, after having been called by an agent proposing a move to Madrid and trials with bigger clubs. He made his debut for the club during the 2016–17 season, scoring three goals in 13 appearances. While at Betis San Isidro, Nteka was left without a paycheck. Eventually, the club offered him 300 euros a month, and to justify the expense, had him take care of the training ground and clean the dressing room.

Fuenlabrada
In November 2017, Randy joined Fuenlabrada and was initially assigned to the reserves in the regional leagues. However, he never played for the B-team, being immediately included in Antonio Calderón's main squad and making his first-team debut on 7 January 2018, starting and scoring the opener in a 2–1 away defeat of Deportivo Fabril in the Segunda División B.

Nteka renewed with Fuenla on 22 June 2018, after agreeing to a three-year deal. He was a regular starter during the campaign, contributing with eight goals as his side achieved promotion to Segunda División for the first time ever.

Nteka made his professional debut on 17 August 2019, starting in a 2–0 away defeat of Elche CF. He scored his first professional goal on 13 October, netting his team's only in a 2–1 away loss against Mirandés.

Nteka scored eight goals for Fuenla during the 2020–21 campaign, being the club's top goalscorer as they achieved a mid-table finish.

Rayo Vallecano
On 28 July 2021, Nteka signed a five-year contract with Rayo Vallecano, newly promoted to La Liga, along with teammate Pathé Ciss. He made his top tier debut on 15 August, starting in a 3–0 loss at Sevilla.

On 29 August 2021, Nteka scored his first goal for Rayo against Granada in a 4–0 home victory.

Loan to Elche
On 1 February 2023, Rayo announced the loan of Nteka to fellow top tier side Elche until the end of the season.

Personal life
Nteka is of Angolan and DR Congolese descent.

Career statistics

Club

Honours 
Fuenlabrada
 Segunda División B: 2018–19

References

External links

1997 births
Living people
French people of Angolan descent
French sportspeople of Democratic Republic of the Congo descent
Footballers from Paris
French footballers
Association football midfielders
La Liga players
Segunda División players
Segunda División B players
Divisiones Regionales de Fútbol players
ESA Linas-Montlhéry players
CD Betis San Isidro players
CF Fuenlabrada footballers
Rayo Vallecano players
Elche CF players
French expatriate footballers
French expatriate sportspeople in Spain
Expatriate footballers in Spain
Black French sportspeople